Neos Sidirodromikos Stathmos (literally new railway station, abbreviated on maps as N. Sid. Stathmos) is an under-construction metro station at the New Thessaloniki railway station, serving Thessaloniki Metro's Line 1 and Line 2. It will serve as the western terminus of both lines and is expected to enter service in 2023. Construction of this station has been held back by major archaeological finds, and it is designated as a mid-importance archaeological site by Attiko Metro, the company overseeing its construction.

The oldest proposal for a metro station at this location goes back to 1918, when it was proposed as a terminus for a metropolitan railway line essentially running the same route as the current Line 1. Neos Sidirodromikos Stathmos was also the terminus for the 1988 Thessaloniki Metro proposal.

References

See also
List of Thessaloniki Metro stations

Thessaloniki Metro